Caulerpa simpliciuscula is a species of seaweed in the Caulerpaceae family.

The species is found in rock pools and the upper sublittoral zones in rough seas. In Western Australia, it is found along the coast in the Mid West region extending south to the South West. It is also found in South Australia Victoria and Tasmania.

References

simpliciuscula
Species described in 1822